Haj Abdelkader Pérez was a Moroccan Admiral and an ambassador to England in 1723 and again in 1737. On 29 August 1724, he met with King George I and the Prince of Wales.

See also
 Abd el-Ouahed ben Messaoud
 Mohammed bin Hadou
 Anglo-Moroccan alliance

Notes

18th-century Moroccan people
18th-century diplomats
Admirals
Ambassadors of Morocco to Great Britain
Military history of Morocco
Moroccan military leaders
Year of birth unknown
Year of death unknown
Moriscos
Moroccan people of Spanish descent